, formerly  and now just , is a Japanese singer-songwriter and former voice actress and gravure idol. She is also known by her nickname  in Japan.

She was originally working for Arts Vision, however, she quit in October 2006. From 2007 she worked for Genki Project, but moved to Intercept in December 2008. On December 17, 2009, she went freelance and changed her name to Yurina Hase. In December 2011, Hase began working for Kekke for her voice actor related activities. In 2014, she took a break from voice acting roles.

In June 2020, she recalled how she experienced sexual harassment from a casting couch from anime studio Sunrise

Filmography

Television animation
 Uta Kata (2004), Keiko Takamura
 To Heart 2 (2004), Konomi Yuzuhara
 Futakoi (2004), Rara Hinagiku
 Tweeny Witches (2004, 2007), Melissa
 Futakoi Alternative (2005), Rara Hinagiku
 Love Get Chu (2006), Yurika Sasaki
 Makai Senki Disgaea (2006), Thursday
 The Idolmaster Live For You! (OVA) (2008), Yukiho Hagiwara
 Hyakko (2008), Suzume Saotome

Video games
 The Idolmaster (2005), Yukiho Hagiwara
 Dawn of Mana (2006), Faye
 Growlanser VI: Precarious World (2007), Yurii
 The Idolmaster (2007), Yukiho Hagiwara
 The Idolmaster Live For You! (2008), Yukiho Hagiwara
 The Idolmaster SP (2009), Yukiho Hagiwara
 The Idolmaster Dearly Stars (2009), Yukiho Hagiwara
 Quiz Magic Academy, Aloe

Internet radio
 Radio To Heart2 (onsen(音泉))
 yurishi･azusa Love Get Chu Miracle Radio(onsen(音泉))

References

External links
 

1979 births
Living people
Voice actresses from Shizuoka Prefecture
Musicians from Shizuoka Prefecture
Japanese video game actresses
Japanese voice actresses
Japanese gravure idols
21st-century Japanese actresses
21st-century Japanese women singers
21st-century Japanese singers
Arts Vision voice actors